Louder! is the debut studio album by Mexican singer-songwriter Sofía Reyes. It was released on 3 February 2017 through Warner Music Latina. The album's release was preceded by the release of the singles "Muévelo", "Conmigo (Rest of Your Life)", "Solo Yo" and "Llegaste Tú". The album also includes the Cash Cash collaboration, "How to Love". The album was originally scheduled to be released in early 2015, however it was delayed for unknown reasons.

Background
After signing with D'Leon Records in June 2014, Reyes released her debut single "Muévelo" and scheduled the release her first album for early 2015. From that date to January 2017, the singer released three more singles, one promotional single and featured on Cash Cash's "How To Love" and Spencer Ludwig's "Diggy". In November 2016, it was announced that Reyes' debut studio album would be titled Louder and that it would be dropped in February 2017.

Singles
Reyes' debut single "Muévelo" was released on August 22, 2014 and featured guest vocals from Puerto Rican rapper Wisin. Reyes co-wrote the "nightclub-friendly anthem" with Wisin, Toby Gad, Lil' Eddie, Eritza Laues, Marissa Jack, and Slikk. The song peaked at number 25 on the Billboard Hot Latin Songs and at number 18 on the Mexico Airplay chart. In Spain, it peaked at number 13 and was certified platinum.

"Conmigo (Rest of Your Life)" was released as the album's second single in early 2016. The song has been described as "a breezy, bilingual pop record with an R&B sensibility" and was written and produced by Romanian producer Andrei Mihai, Nuyorican Lil' Eddie and Reyes.

The third single, "Solo Yo", which features American singer Prince Royce, was released on January 28, 2016. With "Solo Yo", Reyes became the first solo lead female act to hit No. 1 on the Billboard Latin Pop Songs chart in five years. The last time a woman crowned the chart  was in 2011 when Jennifer Lopez spent five weeks atop the chart with "Ven A Bailar". An English version of the song titled "Nobody But Me" was released on March 3, 2016.

On October 21, 2016, Reyes released "Llegaste Tú" featuring Reykon as the album's fourth single.

Promotional singles
"Louder! (Love Is Loud)" featuring Canadian artist Francesco Yates and trumpeter Spencer Ludwig, was released as a promotional single on September 2, 2016. The "upbeat and energetic Spanglish track" was the theme song for Garnier Fructis Mexico #NoCortes campaign.

Track listing

Charts

Certifications

Louder Tour
Reyes embarked on the Louder Tour in order to support the album. The tour began on April 20, 2017 in Buenos Aires at Teatro Gran Rex. On April 11, 2017, it was announced that the tour will visit the United States.

Setlist
This set list is representative of the show on April 20, 2017 in Buenos Aires, Argentina. It is not representative of all concerts for the duration of the tour.

 "Louder! (Love is Loud)"
 "Paraiso"
 "De Aquí a la Luna"
 "Llegaste Tú"
 "Your Voice"
 "Puedes ver pero no tocar"
 "So Beautiful (A Place Called Home)"
 "Solo Yo"
 "Shape of You" 
 "Now Forever"
 "Don't Mean a Thing"
 "Conmigo (Rest of Your Life)"
 "I Don't Wanna Live Forever" 
 "Girls"
 "Muévelo"
 "How to Love"

Tour dates

Cancelled or rescheduled shows

Notes

References

2017 debut albums
Sofía Reyes albums